Horticulture is the branch of agriculture that deals with the art, science, technology, and business of plant cultivation. It includes the cultivation of fruits, vegetables, nuts, seeds, herbs, sprouts, mushrooms, algae, flowers, seaweeds and non-food crops such as grass and ornamental trees and plants. It also includes plant conservation, landscape restoration, landscape and garden design, construction, and maintenance, and arboriculture, ornamental trees and lawns.

In anthropology, horticulture refers to a subsistence strategy characterized by the small-scale, non-industrial cultivation of plants for food. Horticulture involves the use of hand tools such as digging sticks, hoes and carrying baskets. In contrast to horticulture, agriculture is a more intensive strategy involving the use of plowing, animal traction and complex techniques of irrigation and soil management.

The study and practice of horticulture have been traced back thousands of years. Horticulture contributed to the transition from nomadic human communities to sedentary, or semi-sedentary, horticultural communities. Horticulture is divided into several categories which focus on the cultivation and processing of different types of plants and food items for specific purposes. In order to conserve the science of horticulture, multiple organizations worldwide educate, encourage, and promote the advancement of horticulture. Some notable horticulturists include Luca Ghini and Luther Burbank.

Definition

Horticulture, from Latin hortus meaning garden and colere meaning to cultivate, focuses on the use of small plots, in contrast to agronomy which involves intensive crop farming and large-scale field crop production of grains and forages or forestry involving forest trees and products derived from them. It deals with garden crops such as ornamental plants grown for their appearance, fruits and vegetable and spices grown for their food value, and medicinal plants.

Types
There are several major areas of focus within the science of horticulture. They include:
 Olericulture: the production of vegetables.
 Pomology, also called fruticulture: the production of fruits and nuts.
 Viticulture: the production of grapes (largely intended for winemaking).
 Floriculture: the production of flowering and ornamental plants.
 Turf management: the production and maintenance of turf grass for sports, leisure and amenity use.
 Arboriculture: the cultivation and care of individual trees, shrubs, vines, and other perennial woody plants, primarily for landscape and amenity purposes.
 Landscape horticulture: the selection, production and care of plants used in landscape architecture.
 Postharvest physiology: the management of harvested horticultural crops to retard spoilage while stored or transported.
 Environmental horticulture: the science and management of green spaces.
 Interiorscaping: the science and art of using indoor plants. It has an important role in house, hotel, office and mall decor.
 Spices Crops Culture: deals with the cultivation of spice crops which include pepper, nutmeg and cardamom.
 Plantation Crops Culture: deals with the plantation crop growth.
 Medicinal and Aromatic Plants Culture: deals with growing and handling of medicinal and aromatic plants.
 Post-Harvest Management: deals with the post-harvest handling, processing and marketing of horticultural products. It also includes grading, packaging and storage.

History
The history of horticulture overlaps with the history of agriculture and history of botany.

The origins of horticulture lie in the transition of human communities from a nomadic lifestyle as hunter-gatherers to sedentary, or semi-sedentary, horticultural communities. In the Pre-Columbian Amazon Rainforest, natives used biochar to enhance soil productivity by smoldering plant waste. European settlers called this soil Terra Preta de Indio. In forest areas, such horticulture was often carried out in swiddens, or "slash and burn" areas. In pre-contact North America, the semi-sedentary horticultural communities of the Eastern Woodlands, who grew maize, squash, and sunflower, contrasted markedly with the nomadic hunter-gatherer communities of the Plains people. Mesoamerican cultures focused in the cultivating of crops on a small scale, such as the "milpa" or maize field, around their dwellings or in specialized plots which were visited occasionally during migrations from one area to the next. In Central America, Maya horticulture involved augmentation of the forest with useful trees such as papaya, avocado, cacao, ceiba and sapodilla. In the cornfields, multiple crops such as beans, squash, pumpkins and chili peppers were grown, and in some cultures, these crops were tended mainly or exclusively by women.

Organizations
There are various organizations worldwide that focus on promoting and encouraging research and education in all branches of horticultural science; such organizations include the International Society for Horticultural Science and the American Society of Horticultural Science.

In United Kingdom, there are two main horticulture societies. The Ancient Society of York Florists is the oldest horticultural society in the world and was founded in 1768; this organization continues to host four horticultural shows annually in York, UK. Additionally, The Royal Horticultural Society, established in 1804, is a charity in United Kingdom that leads on the encouragement and improvement of the science, art, and practice of horticulture in all its branches. The organization shares the knowledge of horticulture through its community, learning programs, and world-class gardens and shows.

The Chartered Institute of Horticulture (CIoH) is the professional body which represents horticulturists in Great Britain and Ireland while also having an international branch for members outside of these islands. The Australian Society of Horticultural Science was established in 1990 as a professional society to promote and enhance Australian horticultural science and industry. Finally, the New Zealand Horticulture Institute is another known horticultural organization.

In India, Horticultural Society of India (now Indian Academy of Horticultural Sciences) is the oldest society which was established in 1941 at Lyallpur, Punjab (now in Pakistan) but was later shifted to Delhi 1949. The another notable organisation in operation since 2005 is the Society for Promotion of Horticulture based at Bengaluru. Both these societies publish scholarly journals viz., Indian Journal of Horticulture and Journal of Horticultural Sciences for the advancement of horticultural sciences. Horticulture in the Indian state of Kerala is spearheaded by Kerala State Horticulture Mission.

The National Junior Horticultural Association (NJHA) was established in 1934 and was the first organization in the world dedicated solely to youth and horticulture. NJHA programs are designed to help young people obtain a basic understanding of horticulture and develop skills in this ever-expanding art and science.

The Global Horticulture Initiative (GlobalHort) fosters partnerships and collective action among different stakeholders in horticulture. This organization has a special focus on horticulture for development (H4D), which involves using horticulture to reduce poverty and improve nutrition worldwide. GlobalHort is organized in a consortium of national and international organizations which collaborate in research, training, and technology-generating activities designed to meet mutually-agreed-upon objectives. GlobalHort is a non-profit organization registered in Belgium.

Techniques and practices

Propagation 
Plant propagation in horticulture is the process in which the multiplication of a species or cultivar is controlled to fit the desire of the horticulturalist. It is primarily used to increase the number of individual plants while preserving wanted genetic and morphological characteristics. Propagation involves both sexual or asexual methods. In sexual propagation seeds are used, while asexual propagation involves the division of plants, separation of tubers, corms, and bulbs and techniques such as cutting, layering, grafting.

Seed propagation is a common method for both self-pollinating and cross-pollinating plants. If stored in a cool, dry environment, seeds can last years and are a space efficient way to store plants and raraly transmit viruses. However, seeds do not preserve genetic homogeneity and depending on the species, can take a long time to grow into a mature plant.

Asexual, or vegetative propagation relies on the regeneration of plant tissues. Asexual propagation preserves genetic and morphological characteristics and allows for the propagation of species that do not produce seeds. However, the reduced genetic diversity means every individual produced is susceptible to the same diseases.

Asexual propagation techniques include the use of:

 Apomictic seeds
 Vegetative structures capable of regenerating entire plants such as tubers, corms, and runners.
 Layering: propagation by manipulating the plant into regenerating missing parts, the part being regenerated is attached to the original plant. Roots and shoots can be used.
 Cuttings: like layering, except the regenerated part is free from the original plant. Roots, stems, or leaves can be used.
 Grafting: propagation using natural regeneration to fuse two plant parts with callus tissue. The plant part containing the root is the stock, the part being grafted unto the stock is the scion.
 Budding: when the scion of a graft is a single plant bud.
 Tissue culture: propagation involving placing plant tissue, which can be embryos, shoot tips, and callus, onto a substrate supplying food (sugars), inorganic and organic compounds, and growth regulators catered to the type of tissue used.
 Embryo culture: used for species that do not grow an embryo within their fruit.
 Shoot tip culture: useful for producing plants without the risk of disease.
 Callus tissue culture: an experimental method of propagation by which callus tissue is grown and manipulated to differentiate into other plant organ tissue. This method is used in scientific research but is currently considered impractical for horticulture.

Controlling environmental variables 
Environmental control is involved at all scales of horticulture, although the extensiveness of control varies between hobbyist and commercial horticulture. Basic control involves planting  location, sunlight availability, water availability, latitude, and longitude.

More intensive control can involve the use of cold frames, greenhouses, and shade houses. Cold frames provide an enclosed environment, they are built close to the ground and with a top made of glass or plastic. The glass or plastic allows sunlight into the frame during the day and prevents heat loss that would have been lost as long-wave radiation at night. This allows plants to start to be grown before the growing season starts. Greenhouses are similar in function, but are larger in construction and heated with an external source, such as steam. They can be built out of glass, although they are now primarily made from plastic sheets. More expensive and modern greenhouses can include temperature control through shade and light control or air-conditioning as well as automatic watering. Shade houses provide shading to limit water loss by evapotranspiration. 

Temperature control can be done through a variety of methods. Covering plants with plastic in the form of cones, called hot caps, or tunnels can have the same effect as greenhouses. Mulching is also an effective method to protect plants from frost. Other frost prevention methods include the use of wind machines, heaters, and sprinklers. 

Light control by artificially increasing or decreasing the effective length of day through the use of fluorescent lights determines the time in which photosynthesis can occur. This increases the time in which the plant can grow and develop. Controlling the amount of light also controls which plants flower, lengthening the day encourages the flowering of long-day plants and discourages the flowering of short-day plants.

Soil management methods include the use of planned crop rotation to prevent the degradation of soils that are seen in monocultures (need ref), applying fertilisers, and soil analysis.

Water management methods involve employing irrigation and drainage systems, controlling soil moisture to the needs of the species. Methods of irrigation include surface irrigation, sprinkler irrigation, subirrigation, and trickle irrigation. Volume of water, pressure, and frequency are changed to optimise the growing environment. On a small scale watering can be done manually.

Plant selection 
When selecting plants to cultivate, a horticulturist may consider plant aspects based on their intended use and can include plant morphology, rarity, and utility.

Pre-plant bed preparation 
Before planting, plant beds are weeded, extra mulch is removed, fertilizers or other soil enrichment is added, the bed is tilled, and the irrigation system is tested.

Adding plants 
If transplanting plants from a pot to a soil bed, plants are planted at the same depth as the pot and are spaced as to not crowd the plants.

Pruning 
Pruning has multiple functions. If growing shrubs, pruning overgrowth helps preserve the shape. Pruning can also increase the amount of flower buds on some species of flowering plants.

Mulching 
Mulching is the process of applying a layer of mulch on top of the soil layer of a garden. Mulch is a natural weed suppressant, conserves moisture, and helps in moderating the soil temperature. There are different types of mulch and includes leaf and bark substrates.

Weed management 
Weeds can be suppressed and managed through techniques such as mulching, selecting species that reduce weeds, and using cultural techniques.

Challenges

Abiotic stresses 
Commercial horticulture is required to support a rapidly growing population with demands for its products. Due to global climate change, extremes in temperatures, strength of precipitation events, flood frequency, and drought length and frequency are increasing. Together with other abiotic stressors such salinity, heavy metal toxicity, UV damage, and air pollution stressful environments are created for crop production as evapotranspiration is increased, soils are degraded of their nutrients, and oxygen levels are depleted, resulting in up to a 70% loss in crop yield.

Biotic stresses 
Living organisms such as bacteria, viruses, fungi, parasites, insects, weeds and native plants are sources of biotics stresses and can deprive the host of its nutrients. Plants respond to these stresses using defence mechanisms such as morphological and structural barriers, chemical compounds, proteins, enzymes and hormones. The impact of biotic stresses can be prevented using practices such as incorporate tilling, spraying or Integrated Pest Management (IPM).

Transportation 
After harvest, horticultural crops are sold commercially. Loading and in-transit conditions are a challenge to maintain the quality of the products. Distance, transport time and transport methods are factors that need to be considered to minimise bruising and damage to horticultural goods.

Harvest management 
Care is required to reduce damages and losses to horticultural crops during harvest. Compression forces occur during harvesting, and horticultural goods can be hit in a series of impacts during transport and packhouse operations. Different techniques are used to minimize mechanical injuries and wounding to plants such as:

 Manual harvesting: This is the process of harvesting horticultural crops by hand. Fruits, such as apples, pears and peaches, can be harvested by clippers
 Sanitation: Harvest bags, crates, clippers and other equipment must be cleaned prior to harvest.

Emerging technology 
Clustered Regularly Interspaced Short Palindromic Repeats (CRISPR/Cas9) has recently gained recognition as a highly efficient, simplified, precise, and low cost method of altering the genomes of species. Since 2013, CRISPR has been used to enhance a variety of species of grains, fruits, and vegetables. Crops are modified to increase their resistance to biotic and abiotic stressors such as parasites, disease, and drought as well as increase yield, nutrition, and flavour. Additionally, CRISPR has been used to edit undesirable traits, for example, reducing the browning and production of toxic and bitter substances of potatoes. CRISPR has also been employed to solve issues of low pollination rates and low fruit yield common in greenhouses.

See also

 Agricultural science
 Agronomy
 Floriculture
 Forest gardening
 Gardening
 Genetically modified trees
 Genomics of domestication
 Hoe-farming
 Horticultural botany
 Horticultural flora
 Horticultural oil
 Horticultural therapy
 Indigenous horticulture
 Landscaping
 Permaculture
 Plant nutrition
 Plug (horticulture)
 Tropical horticulture
 Turf management
 Vertical farming

References

Further reading
 C.R. Adams, Principles of Horticulture Butterworth-Heinemann; 5th edition (11 Aug 2008), .

External links

 The Institute of Horticulture
 ISHS – International Society for Horticultural Science
 The Royal Horticultural Society
 British Library – information on the horticulture industry
 History of Horticulture 
 HORTIVAR – The FAO Horticulture Cultivars Performance Database
 Global Horticulture Initiative – GlobalHort
 Horticulture Information & Resource Library
 Plant and Soil Sciences eLibrary

 
Agronomy
Agriculture by type